Pir Anjiri (also Romanized as Pīr Anjīrī; also known as Pīr Anjīr) is a village in Salehabad Rural District, Salehabad County, Razavi Khorasan Province, Iran. At the 2006 census, its population was 56, in 12 families.

References 

Populated places in   Torbat-e Jam County